Siegfried (Franz Johann Carl) Graf (from 1920, Fürst) von Clary und Aldringen (14 October 1848 – 11 February 1929) was an Austro-Hungarian diplomat during the time before World War I.

Life

He was born in Teplitz (now Teplice) on 14 October 1848 into a prominent Bohemian noble family, the second son of Prince Edmund Moritz and Princess Elisabeth-Alexandrine von Clary-und-Aldringen (née Countess de Ficquelmont). In 1885, he married Therese (née Gräfin Kinsky von Wchinitz und Tettau) in Vienna. The couple had three children. His younger brother Manfred (1852–1928) served briefly as Minister-President of Austria in 1899.

Count von Clary-Aldringen entered the Austro-Hungarian foreign service in 1873 and served inter alia in Paris and St. Petersburg, following the path of his grandfather, Count Charles-Louis de Ficquelmont. From 1895 until 1897 he was counselor at the embassy in London. In 1897, he was appointed Austro-Hungarian Minister at Stuttgart succeeding the future Imperial Foreign Minister Burián von Rajecz and then from 1899 at Dresden, two of the three missions that Austria-Hungary had in Germany other than Berlin (the third one was in Munich). Although mostly maintained due to the claims of tradition, these missions were popular postings due to personal comfort and convenience and particularly the post in Dresden was generally awarded to someone enjoying the special favour of Emperor Franz Joseph I.

In December 1902, Count von Clary-Aldringen was appointed to serve as Minister at Brussels and would remain there for eleven years until 1914. Acting as the doyen of the diplomatic corps in Brussels and personally popular, it fell upon him to deliver the declaration of war on 28 August. When leaving Brussels, he handed over the legation to the US minister in Belgium Brand Whitlock. He played no further role during the war. He and his family were close friends with William Cavendish-Bentinck, 6th Duke of Portland, and therefore often visited the Portlands in London and Welbeck Abbey.

In March 1920, he became the sixth Prince von Clary-Aldringen following his older brother Carlos' death and died in Teplitz on 11 February 1929. His son Alfons  (1887–1978) became the seventh prince, but lost his property in the Czechoslovak Republic in 1945.

Notes 
 
 See Also: Clary-Aldringen

References

Bibliography 
 Helga Peham, Siegfried Graf Clary und Aldringen (1848-1929). Leben und Wirken eines österreichisch-ungarischen Diplomaten, Vienna, 1981.

1848 births
1929 deaths
Austro-Hungarian diplomats of World War I
Austro-Hungarian diplomats
Austrian diplomats
Austrian princes
Bohemian nobility
Siegfried